Brutal Calling is a collaborative album by Bill Laswell and Submerged, released on May 25, 2004 by Avant Records. It was also issued for a limited time in vinyl format on the German label Karlrecords and was the debut release for that company.

Track listing

Personnel 
Adapted from the Brutal Calling liner notes.
Musicians
Bill Laswell – bass guitar, effects, producer, mixing
Submerged – drum programming, effects, producer
Technical personnel
James Dellatacoma – assistant engineer
Michael Fossenkemper – mastering
Ikue Mori – design
Robert Musso – engineering
Alex Theoret – mastering

Release history

References

External links 
 Brutal Calling at Bandcamp
 

2004 albums
Collaborative albums
Bill Laswell albums
Albums produced by Bill Laswell
Avant Records albums